Jamie-Jerry Taulagi (born 18 June 1993) is a professional rugby union footballer of Samoan heritage. His usual position is fullback or wing. He has played for the Queensland Reds and Sunwolves teams in Super Rugby. He currently plays for Narbonne in the French Pro D2 competition.

Early life
Taulagi was born in Auckland, New Zealand. As a junior rugby player he was selected in the Auckland East team which won the Roller Mills Shield in 2006. He attended De La Salle College from 2005 to 2010 where he was part of the 1st XV in 2009 that played in the Sanix World Rugby Youth Invitational Tournament. Taulagi then attended St Kentigern College and played for the 1st XV rugby team which won the Auckland 1A Championship in 2011. He moved to Brisbane, Australia in 2012.

Rugby career
Taulagi joined the University of Queensland Rugby Club and played for the Premier Rugby team that won the Hospital Cup in 2012. He was invited into the ARU's National Academy and selected to play in an Under-19 match for Queensland against New South Wales in October 2012. In August 2013, he signed a foreign development player contract with the Queensland Reds, where he made 10 appearances in three seasons.

He moved to Japan in 2016 to ply for Munakata Sanix Blues in the Top League and later signed with the Sunwolves for the 2017 season.

Taulagi was selected in the  national squad for their 2017 end-of-year tour. In England, he joined Devon club Newton Abbot RFC in a bid to win a contract with Exeter Chiefs for the 2017–18 season.

Personal life
Taulagi's younger brother, Murray, is currently a member of the North Queensland Cowboys NRL squad.

References

External links
 Player stats on It's Rugby

1993 births
New Zealand rugby union players
New Zealand sportspeople of Samoan descent
Queensland Reds players
Rugby union fullbacks
Rugby union wings
Rugby union players from Auckland
Living people
People educated at Saint Kentigern College
Queensland Country (NRC team) players
Munakata Sanix Blues players
Australian expatriate rugby union players
Expatriate rugby union players in Japan
Australian expatriate sportspeople in Japan
Samoa international rugby union players
Sunwolves players